Shamsiyeh (also Romanized as Shamsīyeh; also known as Shamīyeh) is a village in Rivand Rural District, in the Central District of Nishapur County, Razavi Khorasan Province, Iran. At the 2006 census, its population was 153, in 37 families.

References 

Populated places in Nishapur County